The 1947 Ottawa Rough Riders finished in 1st place in the Interprovincial Rugby Football Union with an 8–4 record but lost the IRFU Finals to the Toronto Argonauts.

Preseason

Regular season

Standings

Schedule

Postseason

Playoffs

References

Ottawa Rough Riders seasons
1947 Canadian football season by team